is a male Japanese popular music artist and composer.  He made his debut on 1 November 1982 with the single We Got It!.

Discography

Singles
 "We Got It!" (1 November 1982)
 "CAFE FLAMINGO" (1 February 1983)
 "JULIET" (1 July 1983)
 "TIGHT UP" (1 February 1984)
 "RAINY DAY GIRL" (21 June 1984)
 "DOUBLE IMAGINATION" (21 September 1984)
 "KISS MARK" (20 April 1985)
 "CLOSE YOUR EYES" (28 September 1985)
 "Tenesi Warutsu" (23 April 1986)
 "SHO-NEN" (29 September 1986)
 "Shuga Boi de Itekure" (6 April 1987)
 "Memories" (25 May 1988) ranked 92nd in Oricon singles charts
 "Midori" (27 July 1990)
 "China Rain in Christmas" (10 November 1990)
 "Calling You" (28 November 1991)
 "Kimi ni Furu Yuki" (25 January 1993)

Albums
 Hold Me Tight (1 March 1983) – Re-released by CD twice on 21 April 1984 and 25 May 1988
 Moderato (21 June 1984) – Re-released by CD on 25 May 1988
 Slit (19 January 1985) – Re-released by CD on 25 May 1988, and on 22 July 1992
 The Panorama Memory (20 July 1985) – Re-released by CD on 22 October 1985
 Frame of Mind (1 November 1985)
 Tune Box the Summer 1986 (2 July 1986) – Re-released by CD on 27 March 1996
 Invitation (20 December 1986)
 Urban Spirits (1 May 1987) – Re-released by CD on 27 March 1996
 Hold Me Tight – Moderato (25 November 1987)
 Summer Time in Blue (5 June 1988), ranked 30th on Oricon albums charts – Re-released by CD on 27 March 1996
 We Got It! (6 July 1988)
 Panorama Memory II (21 June 1989)
 Singles (13 March 1991)
 Tengoku ha Mattekureru (18 November 1991), ranked 73rd in Oricon albums charts
 Ballades (22 January 1992)
 Best Collection (26 August 1992)
 Dear. (25 January 1993) ranked 64th in Oricon albums charts
 Passage (21 October 1994)
 Gallery (5 October 1995)
 4 New Comers (27 November 2002)
 Heaven Roses (5 March 2003)
 Chronicle (18 June 2003)

References

External links
 Official Website

1956 births
Japanese pop musicians
Living people
Musicians from Tokyo